

Georg Scholze (21 August 1897 – 23 April 1945) was a German general during World War II.  He was also a recipient of the Knight's Cross of the Iron Cross of Nazi Germany. Scholze committed suicide on 23 April 1945 in Berlin.

Awards and decorations

 Knight's Cross of the Iron Cross on 17 February 1943 as Oberst and commander of Infanterie-Lehr-Regiment

References
Citations

Bibliography

 

1897 births
1945 suicides
Major generals of the German Army (Wehrmacht)
Recipients of the clasp to the Iron Cross, 1st class
Recipients of the Gold German Cross
Recipients of the Knight's Cross of the Iron Cross
German military personnel who committed suicide
People from Löbau
Military personnel from Saxony